U.S. Route 50 (US 50) is a major east–west route of the U.S. Highway System, stretching just over  from Ocean City, Maryland, on the Atlantic Ocean, to West Sacramento, California, nearly to the Pacific Ocean.  In Washington, D.C., US 50 passes between Arlington County, Virginia, and Prince George's County, Maryland, predominantly along surface streets, including a part of Constitution Avenue along the National Mall.

Route description

US 50 enters the District of Columbia from Arlington, Virginia, merging with I-66 on the Theodore Roosevelt Bridge over the Potomac River. US 50 traffic exits I-66 onto Constitution Avenue along the north side of the National Mall, passing the Lincoln Memorial, the Vietnam Veterans Memorial, the White House, the World War II Memorial, and the Washington Monument, then traveling between Federal Triangle's office buildings on the north and the Smithsonian Institution's National Museum of American History, National Museum of Natural History, and a National Gallery of Art sculpture garden to its south.

Near the National Gallery of Art, US 50 turns left onto 6th Street NW, and after several blocks, right onto New York Avenue. The northern terminus of I-395 is at a signaled intersection with New York Avenue and 4th Street NW. At that intersection, traffic from New York Avenue in either direction may turn south onto I-395, but traffic on northbound I-395 may turn only right (east) onto New York Avenue, but not west toward downtown Washington. US 1 northbound runs concurrently with US 50 along Constitution Avenue from 14th Street NW to 6th Street NW, and along 6th Street from Constitution Avenue to New York Avenue.

The route continues northeast on New York Avenue through Northeast Washington, passing the United States National Arboretum. US 1 Alternate is concurrent with US  50 along New York Avenue between 6th Street NW and Bladensburg Road. Beyond the Arboretum, New York Avenue becomes a freeway, with an off-level interchange with South Dakota Avenue, NE in the Fort Lincoln area. US 50 then crosses the Anacostia River and continues into Maryland, where it becomes the John Hanson Highway and intersects the Baltimore-Washington Parkway.

History
The New York Avenue Industrial Freeway, if built, would have replaced New York Avenue as U.S. Route 50 east of Interstate 395.

Major intersections
The entire route is in Washington. All exits are unnumbered.

References

External links

District of Columbia Highway(s), from Yurasko.net
Washington D.C. Interstates and Freeways, from Roads to the Future

 District of Columbia
50